Preciosa Sangre (English for "Precious Blood") may refer to:

 the blood of Christ (Spanish: "sangre de Cristo");
 the Missionaries of the Precious Blood;
 the Congregation of the Precious Blood of Our Lord Jesus Christ, founded in 1887 by Mother Magdalena Guerrero Larraín in Chile;
 or one of its educational institutions:
 Colegio Santa Cecilia, in Santiago;
 Escuela Preciosa Sangre, in Nuñoa;
 Colegio Niño Jesús de Praga, in Rancagua;
 Colegio de la Preciosa Sangre, in Pichilemu; or
 Colegio Preciosa Sangre, in Purranque

See also 
 Sangre (disambiguation)